Abraxas breueri is a species of moth belonging to the family Geometridae. It was described by Dieter Stüning and Axel Hausmann in 2002. It is known from Mindanao in the Philippines.

The wingspan is 33–40 mm [1.29 - 1.57 in.].

References

Abraxini
Moths of Asia
Moths described in 2002